Guendalina is a 1957 Italian comedy film directed by Alberto Lattuada. It was entered into the 1957 Cannes Film Festival.

Cast
 Jacqueline Sassard as Guendalina
 Raf Mattioli as Oberdan
 Sylva Koscina as Francesca, Guendalina's mother
 Raf Vallone as Guido, Guendalina's father
 Leda Gloria as Oberdan's mother
 Lili Cerasoli as Bianchina
 Fanny Landini
 Loretta Capitoli
 Leonardo Botta
 Antonio Mambretti as Businessman
 Flavia Solivani
 Tonino Cianci
 Enzo Cerusico as Postman
 Giancarlo Cobelli as Barber
 Decimo Cristiani

References

External links

1957 films
1950s Italian-language films
1957 comedy films
Italian black-and-white films
Films directed by Alberto Lattuada
Films produced by Carlo Ponti
Films produced by Dino De Laurentiis
Italian comedy films
1950s Italian films